Comamonas denitrificans is a Gram-negative, oxidase- and catalase-positive, motile bacterium with a polar flagellum from the genus Comamonas and family  Comamonadaceae, which was isolated from an activated sludge. Its colonies are yellow-white colored. Unlike other species of Comamonas,  C. denitrificans can reduce nitrate to nitrogen gas.

References

External links
Type strain of Comamonas denitrificans at BacDive -  the Bacterial Diversity Metadatabase

Comamonadaceae
Bacteria described in 2008